Rupert Kratzer (16 February 1945 – 23 September 2013) was a German cyclist. He competed in the individual pursuit at the 1968 Summer Olympics.

References

External links
 

1945 births
2013 deaths
German male cyclists
Olympic cyclists of West Germany
Cyclists at the 1968 Summer Olympics
Cyclists from Munich